F.C. Schëffleng 95 or FC Schifflange 95 is a football club in Schifflange, Luxembourg.

It was founded in 1995. They play in the second tier-Division of Honour, after being promoted from the Division of Honour after the 2019–20 season. They play their home games at the Stade Rue Denis Netgen.

History
FC Schifflange 95 is the result of a merger between former Schifflange sides Amis des Sports (founded in 1936) and National Schifflange (founded in 1912). National Schifflange was a one-time Luxembourg champion after winning the 1951–52 Luxembourg National Division. National also won the 1960 Luxembourg Cup. The new merger club was established on 21 April 1995.

The first season of the new club saw them winning the 1st Division, with a four-point lead. After three seasons in the Promotion d'Honneur, FC Schifflange 95 clinched promotion to the top level Luxembourg National Division but got relegated immediately after that one season. Since its establishment, the club has therefore played only one season at the top level, six seasons in Division of Honour, 11 seasons in Division 1 and five seasons in Division 2.

Honours

Domestic
as National Schifflange

League
Luxembourg National Division
Winners (1): 1951–52
Runners-up (2): 1949–50, 1950-51

Cup
Luxembourg Cup
Winners (1): 1960
Runners-up (1): 1938

Players

Current squad

Former Players 

Miralem Pjanić, who later played for AS Roma, Juventus Turin and FC Barcelona, has started his youth career at age 7 in Schifflange, and stayed with the club for 7 years.

References

External links
Official club site
Club page - FLF

Football clubs in Luxembourg
Association football clubs established in 1995
1995 establishments in Luxembourg